Bip or BiP or BIP may refer to:

Software 

 BiP – Messaging, Voice and Video Calling: a smartphone application

Entertainment 
 Bip (channel), a comedy channel
 Bip the clown, a famous character of mime Marcel Marceau
 Bachelor in Paradise (American TV series)

Organizations 
 BIP Brewery,, a brewery in Belgrade, Serbia
 BIP Investment Partners, an investment company
 Botswana Independence Party, a political party in Botswana
 British International Pictures, a British film production, distribution and exhibition company

People 
 BiP (Believe in People), anonymous street artist
 Bip Roberts (born 1963), American Major League Baseball player
 Boom Bip (born 1974), American record producer and musician

Technology 
 bip! (Red Metropolitana de Movilidad), a contactless smartcard fare system used in Transantiago and Metro de Santiago, in Santiago de Chile
 Basic Imaging Profile, a Bluetooth profile for sending images between devices
 Bearer Independent Protocol
 Binary integer programming, a special case of integer programming
 Bit interface parity, parity protection on computer interfaces

Transport 
 Bishopstone railway station, a railway station in Sussex, England

Other uses 
 Binding immunoglobulin protein (BiP), a molecular ER chaperone that regulates protein folding
 Biuletyn Informacji Publicznej (Bulletin of Public Information), a government-sponsored public information system in Poland

See also
 Basis point (bp), pronounced as bip
 Bips (disambiguation)
 BP (disambiguation)